Death to Music is the third full-length album by the band Nightstick, released in 1999 on Relapse Records.

Track listing
All songs were written by Robert Williams.

 "Babykiller" – 09:36
 "Jarhead" – 03:16
 "Young Man, Old Man" – 08:04
 "(Won't You Take Me To) Junkytown" – 04:58
 "The American Way" – 03:25
 "Free Man" – 03:40
 "In Dahmer's Room" – 11:56
 "Boot Party Theme" – 05:36
 "Egghead: a) 'I Am Egghead', b) Naked Came The Egg, c) Egghead Is Dead" – 09:57

Personnel
 Alex Smith – vocals, bass
 Cotie Cowgill – guitars
 Robert Williams – drums, backing vocals

Nightstick (band) albums
1999 albums